Douglas and Angus (commonly referred to as Douglas) is an area of Eastern Dundee, Scotland. It is located between Whitfield to the North and Broughty Ferry to the East.

In the eastern part of Douglas is the distinctive Michelin Tyre factory which was the first factory in the U.K. to produce tyres by using energy from wind power. The two tall wind turbines on the factory site can be seen from many places around Dundee and the surrounding area.

Transport links
Douglas is the Eastern terminus of the 28 and 29 Douglas to Charleston Discovery Line bus service.

28- Douglas/Charleston, Balgarthno Road via City Centre

29- Douglas/Charleston, Dunholm Road via City Centre

Leisure

Places of Worship

Places of worship in Douglas include St. Pius X Roman Catholic Church in Balerno Street and Douglas Parish Church (Church of Scotland) in Balbeggie Pl, Dundee DD4 8RD.

References

Areas of Dundee